A list of films produced by the Hindi language film industry based in Mumbai in 1940:

Panchaayat

Highest-grossing films
The five highest-grossing films at the Indian Box Office in 1940:

A

B-D

E-J

K-N

O-R

S

T-Z

References

External links
 Bollywood films of 1940 at the Internet Movie Database
Listen to songs from Bollywood films of 1940

 ही आना (Tum Hi Aana) Song lyrics html.तुम ही आना (Tum Hi Aana) Song lyrics.

1940
Bollywood
Films, Bollywood